Raúl Lucio Lozano (born 3 September 1956) is an Argentine professional volleyball coach and former player.

Personal life
He is married to Laura. On 2 February 1996, his wife gave birth to their son Matias, who was born in Barcelona.

Career as coach
Lozano with Volley Milano winner two gold medal in FIVB Club World Championship. He directed the national teams of Spain in 1994-1997 and 1999-2000, 2000-2001 Volley Treviso and Germany in 2008-2011. He won two European Cups (with Milan and Palermo, respectively) as well as the Italian National League with Sisley Treviso. He led Spain to a silver medal finish in the World University Games in Japan and a fifth-place finish in the World League and World Cup in 1999. Lozano in 2005-2008 worked with Poland national volleyball team. In 2006 led Poland to silver medal of the World Championship 2006. On December 6, 2006 received a state award granted by the Polish President Lech Kaczyński – Knight's Cross of Polonia Restituta for outstanding contribution to the development of Polish sport, for achievements in training.

In April 2015 he signed a contract with Polish club Cerrad Czarni Radom. After parting ways with the Serbian Slobodan Kovac, the Iranian federation chose Raul Lozano as his replacement. On November 17, 2015 he has been officially named as head coach of the Iran national volleyball team. He led Iran to their first appearance at the Summer Olympics in 2016 Rio. Lozano after one year stayed in Asia, Raul Lozano has signed on as the new head coach of the Chinese national team, which makes him the program's first-ever foreign head coach.

Honours

As a coach
 CEV Champions League
  2000/2001 – with Sisley Treviso

 FIVB Club World Championship
  Treviso 1992 – with Misura Milano

 CEV Cup
  1992/1993 – with Misura Milano
   1993/1994 – with Milan Volley

 CEV Challenge Cup
  1998/1999 – with Iveco Palermo

 National championships
 1981/1982  Argentine Cup, with Obras Sanitarias
 1982/1983  Argentine Championship, with Obras Sanitarias
 1984/1985  Argentine Championship, with Ferro Carril Oeste
 1986/1987  Argentine Championship, with Ferro Carril Oeste
 2000/2001  Italian SuperCup, with Sisley Treviso
 2000/2001  Italian Championship, with Sisley Treviso

 Universiade
 1995  Summer Universiade, with Spain

State awards
 2006:  Knight's Cross of Polonia Restituta

References

External links

 
 Coach profile at LegaVolley.it 
 Coach profile at Volleybox.net

1956 births
Living people
Sportspeople from La Plata
Argentine men's volleyball players
Argentine volleyball coaches
Volleyball coaches of international teams
Argentine expatriate sportspeople in Italy
Argentine expatriate sportspeople in Spain
Argentine expatriate sportspeople in Greece
Argentine expatriate sportspeople in Poland
Argentine expatriate sportspeople in Iran
Argentine expatriate sportspeople in China
Argentine expatriate sportspeople in Japan
Czarni Radom coaches